Slavoška is a small village and municipality in the Rožňava District in the Košice Region of middle-eastern Slovakia.

History
In historical records the village was first mentioned in 1563.

Geography
The village lies at an altitude of 430 metres and covers an area of 4.377 km².
It has a population of about 120 people.

Culture
The village has a public library.

External links
 Slavoška
Statistics

Villages and municipalities in Rožňava District